The 1987 Monte Carlo Open was a men's tennis tournament played on outdoor clay courts at the Monte Carlo Country Club in Roquebrune-Cap-Martin, France that was part of the 1987 Nabisco Grand Prix. It was the 81st edition of the tournament and was held from 20 April through 26 April 1987. First-seeded Mats Wilander won the singles title, his second at the event after 1983.

Finals

Singles

 Mats Wilander defeated  Jimmy Arias, 4–6, 7–5, 6–1, 6–3
 It was Wilander's 2nd singles title of the year and the 23rd of his career.

Doubles
 Hans Gildemeister /  Andrés Gómez defeated  Mansour Bahrami /  Michael Mortensen, 6–2, 6–4

References

External links
 
 ATP tournament profile
 ITF tournament edition details

 
Monte Carlo Open
Monte-Carlo Masters
1987 in Monégasque sport
Monte